Walter Moritz Boas FAA (10 February 1904 – 12 May 1982) was a German-Australian metallurgist.

Boas was born in Berlin, Germany and was educated at the Berlin Institute of Technology (Dip. Engin. 1928, Dr.-Ing. 1930). After several positions at German and Swiss institutions, Boas became a lecturer in metallurgy at University of Melbourne in 1938; then from 1940 to 1947, senior lecturer. From 1947 to 1949, Boas was principal research officer, CSIR Division of Tribophysics; and from 1949 to 1969 chief of the division.

The Walter Boas Medal of the Australian Institute of Physics is named in his honour.

References

1904 births
1982 deaths
Australian physicists
Fellows of the Australian Academy of Science
German emigrants to Australia